Ernesto Frits Hoost (born 11 July 1965) is a Dutch retired professional kickboxer. A four-time K-1 World Champion, Hoost is considered to be one of the greatest kickboxers of all time. Debuting in 1993 at the K-1 World Grand Prix 1993, where he came just one win short of the world title, Hoost announced his retirement thirteen years later on 2 December 2006 after the K-1 World GP Final tournament in Tokyo Dome, Japan. Peter Aerts (4x), Branko Cikatić, Mirko Cro Cop (3x), Jérôme Le Banner (3x), Andy Hug (3x), Ray Sefo (3x), Musashi (2x), Mike Bernardo, Francisco Filho (2x), Sam Greco, Stefan Leko (3x), Mark Hunt, Cyril Abidi, and Glaube Feitosa.

Biography
Hoost was born in Heemskerk, North Holland to Surinamese parents. He played football for amateur club Hollandia until he was 15 years old, when he started training in kickboxing at the newly opened Sokudo Gym. In 1983, he had his first match against Wim Scharrenberg, which he won by knockout in the second round. From 1988, his career accelerated, winning several European and world titles in Savate and Muay Thai. He quit his job as a sports teacher for alternative punished youngsters to focus on his career as a professional fighter.

In the K-1 Grand Prix '93, the inaugural K-1 World Grand Prix, Hoost defeated Peter Aerts by decision in the quarterfinals, knocked out Maurice Smith in the semifinals, and advanced to the tournament final where he was knocked out by Branko Cikatic. Hoost got another shot at a title on 19 December 1993, when he won the K-2 World Championship, knocking out Changpuek Kiatsongrit in four rounds. This was the only time the K-1 organisation held a K-2 tournament.

Hoost reached the K-1 World Grand Prix Finals again in 1995, but lost to Peter Aerts by a four-round decision. He went on to win every fight the remainder of that year. In 1996, he lost at the K-1 World Grand Prix 1996 finals to Andy Hug by a five-round split decision. He finally became K-1 World Champion in 1997 when he beat Hug by a three-round unanimous decision.

Hoost was unable to defend his title at the K-1 World Grand Prix 1998 tournament, being technically knocked out in the quarterfinals by Australian Sam Greco due to being unable to start the 3rd round after a cut above his left eye; he was mostly dominated in the fight by Greco.

In 1999, Hoost won his second K-1 World Grand Prix title, beating Mirko Cro Cop by technical knockout in the third round. On 23 April 2000, Hoost avenged his loss to Greco when he beat him by a technical knockout.

Hoost retained the K-1 World Grand Prix Championship title for third time in 2000 by defeating Ray Sefo. By then, many K-1 fans were hoping for a meeting between Hoost and Bob Sapp. Hoost returned to defend his crown in 2001 defeating Stefan Leko. However, he was forced to retire from the tournament due to an injured shin before the semi-finals.

The highly anticipated fight with Bob Sapp came at the K-1 World Grand Prix 2002 Final Elimination. Sapp won by technical knockout in the first round after the doctor stopped the match on cuts. Despite the loss he was again matched up with Sapp in the quarter finals of the K-1 World Grand Prix 2002. After trading knockdowns with Sapp in first round, Hoost lost again in a wild slugfest when referee Nobuaki Kakuda declared a KO while Hoost was still standing, but after the fight, Sapp turned out to have broken his hand and suffered four cracked ribs, and wasn't able to continue, allowing Hoost to replace him in the semi-finals. Hoost beat Ray Sefo in first round by TKO, after Sefo damaged his shin against Hoost's kneecap. Hoost proceeded to his fifth K-1 Finals, and was matched up against Jerome Le Banner. The fight was clearly in Le Banner's favour up until the third and final round when Le Banner injured his arm blocking Hoost's kick. Hoost aggressively attacked the arm again, forcing Le Banner down with only 94 seconds left in the match, winning by TKO and his fourth Grand Prix Championship. Le Banner suffered a severe compound fracture, putting him out of competition for over a year.

In 2003, Hoost would continue his feud with Bob Sapp in another arena of combat sports, professional wrestling. At AJPW's 2nd WRESTLE-1 event held in the Tokyo Dome, Hoost would defeat Sapp after delivering a chair shot and slap to the back of the head which led to a schoolboy pin.

In addition to his Grand Prix titles Ernesto Hoost fought a number of Super fights. In 2004 he was again in the K-1 World Grand Prix 2004 finals, in which he lost to the eventual Grand Prix champion Remy Bonjasky.

In 2006, Hoost declared that he would fight his last tournament in K-1. In the K-1 World Grand Prix 2006, Hoost was defeated in the semi-finals by Semmy Schilt. An emotional Hoost was met with a standing ovation from the audience as he left the arena.

Hoost is well known for training "Knees of Fury" fighters Paul Slowinski (whom he is currently still training). Under his guidance Slowinski has won the K-1 tournament 2007 in Amsterdam.  He has also trained leg strikes, wrestling, and other skills with PRIDE Champion Fedor Emelianenko.

Hoost was also present as a cornerman for UFC fighter Antoni Hardonk in Hardonk's UFC 85 bout with Eddie Sanchez, his UFC 92 win over Mike Wessel, and his UFC 97 loss to Cheick Kongo.

In 2012, Hoost was invited by the Katana Fighting Series to be guest of honour at their Katana 6 'Rebellion' show.

Hoost made a comeback aged 48. In his first fight in over eight years, he scored two knockdowns en route to a unanimous decision victory over Thomas Stanley at Hoost Cup: Legend in Nagoya, Japan on 23 March 2014.

He defeated Peter Aerts in their sixth meeting via unanimous decision on 19 October 2014 in Osaka to win the vacant WKO World Heavyweight Championship.

Fighting style
Ernesto Hoost is generally considered to be among the greatest strikers of all time. While he lacked the sheer physicality of other heavyweights, he was able to succeed through his superior speed, accuracy, devastating combinations, and tactical brilliance. His nickname "Mr. Perfect" stemmed from his ability to throw complex combinations with almost machine-like technical precision. Hoost's most feared strike was his signature low kick, which he utilized at the end of his combinations to cripple his opponent throughout the course of a match. He was able to finish top competition such as Ray Sefo, Mirko Cro Cop, and Igor Vovchanchyn through his use of the low kick. Hoost also enjoyed a strong countering game as well as having high defensive acumen. This allowed him to survive when more powerful fighters attempted to brawl, although this notably failed (twice) against the 350 pound Bob Sapp.

Personal life
Hoost currently lives in the town of Hoorn, together with his wife and children.

Titles
2014 WKO World Heavyweight Champion
2002 K-1 World Grand Prix 2002 champion in Tokyo, Japan
2001 K-1 World Grand Prix 2001 in Melbourne champion in Melbourne, Australia
2000 K-1 World Grand Prix 2000 champion in Tokyo, Japan
2000 K-1 World Grand Prix 2000 in Nagoya runner up in Nagoya, Japan
1999 K-1 Grand Prix '99 Final Round champion in Tokyo, Japan
1997 K-1 Grand Prix '97 Final champion in Tokyo, Japan
1994 I.S.K.A. Full Contact Light Heavyweight World champion in Marseilles, France
1994 K-2 Plus Tournament 1994 champion in Amsterdam, the Netherlands
1993 K-2 Grand Prix '93 champion in Tokyo, Japan
1993 W.M.T.A. & W.K.A. Light Heavyweight World champion in Tokyo, Japan
1993 K-1 Grand Prix '93 runner up in Tokyo, Japan
1992 W.M.T.A. Muay Thai World Champion -79.8 kg in the Netherlands
1990 WMTA Muay Thai World Champion -79.8 kg in Amsterdam, Netherlands
1990 W.K.A. World Kickboxing champion in Amsterdam, the Netherlands
1989 W.M.T.A. Muay Thai World Champion in Amsterdam, the Netherlands
1989 Savate World Champion in Paris, France
1988 W.K.A. European Kickboxing champion in Strasbourg, France
1988 Savate European champion in Strasbourg, France
1988 I.S.K.A. European Full Contact champion in Le Havre, France
1988 I.S.K.A. European Muay Thai Champion in Arnhem, the Netherlands
1987 WMTB Dutch Muay Thai Champion in Amsterdam, the Netherlands

Other
Black Belt Magazine
2004 Full-Contact Fighter of the Year

Kickboxing record

|-
|-  bgcolor="#CCFFCC"
| 2014-10-19 || Win||align=left| Peter Aerts || WKO: Kumite Energy || Osaka, Japan ||Decision (Unanimous)  || 3 || 2:00 || 99-21-1
|-
! style=background:white colspan=9 |
|-
|-  bgcolor="#CCFFCC"
| 2014-03-23 || Win ||align=left| Thomas Stanley || Hoost Cup: Legend || Nagoya, Japan || Decision (Unanimous)  || 3 || 2:00 || 98-21-1
|-  bgcolor="#FFBBBB"
| 2006-12-02 || Loss ||align=left| Semmy Schilt || K-1 World Grand Prix 2006 Semi Finals || Tokyo, Japan || Decision (Unanimous) || 3 || 3:00 || 97-21-1
|-  bgcolor="#CCFFCC"
| 2006-12-02 || Win || align="left" | Chalid Arrab || K-1 World Grand Prix 2006 Quarter Finals || Tokyo, Japan || Ext. R Decision (Unanimous) || 4 || 3:00 || 97-20-1
|-  bgcolor="#CCFFCC"
| 2006-09-30 || Win ||align=left| Yusuke Fujimoto || K-1 World Grand Prix 2006 in Osaka Opening Round || Osaka, Japan || KO (Right low kick)|| 3 || 2:09 || 96-20-1
|-
! style=background:white colspan=9 |
|-
|-  bgcolor="#CCFFCC"
| 2006-05-13 || Win ||align=left| Peter Aerts || K-1 World Grand Prix 2006 in Amsterdam || Amsterdam, Netherlands || Decision (Majority) || 3 || 3:00 || 95-20-1
|-  bgcolor="#FFBBBB"
| 2005-12-31 || Loss ||align=left| Semmy Schilt || K-1 PREMIUM 2005 Dynamite!! || Tokyo, Japan || TKO (Referee stoppage) || 2 || 0:41 || 94-20-1
|-  bgcolor="#FFBBBB"
| 2004-12-04 || Loss ||align=left| Remy Bonjasky || K-1 World Grand Prix 2004 Quarter Finals || Tokyo, Japan || Ext. R Decision || 4 || 3:00 || 94-19-1
|-  bgcolor="#CCFFCC"
| 2004-09-25 || Win ||align=left| Glaube Feitosa || K-1 World Grand Prix 2004 Final Elimination || Tokyo, Japan || Decision (Unanimous) || 3 || 3:00 || 94-18-1
|-
! style=background:white colspan=9 |
|-
|-  bgcolor="#CCFFCC"
| 2004-03-27 || Win ||align=left| Xhavit Bajrami || K-1 World Grand Prix 2004 in Saitama || Saitama, Japan || Decision (Unanimous) || 3 || 3:00 || 93-18-1
|-  bgcolor="#CCFFCC"
| 2003-12-31 || Win ||align=left| Montanha Silva || K-1 PREMIUM 2003 Dynamite!! || Tokyo, Japan || Decision (Unanimous) || 3 || 3:00 || 92-18-1
|-  bgcolor="#CCFFCC"
| 2003-07-13 || Win ||align=left| Cyril Abidi || K-1 World Grand Prix 2003 in Fukuoka || Fukuoka, Japan || Decision (Unanimous) || 2 || 3:00 || 91-18-1
|-  bgcolor="#CCFFCC"
| 2003-06-14 || Win ||align=left| Martin Holm || K-1 World Grand Prix 2003 in Paris || Paris, France || Decision (Unanimous) || 5 || 3:00 || 90-18-1
|-  bgcolor="#CCFFCC"
| 2003-03-30 || Win ||align=left| Jefferson Silva || K-1 World Grand Prix 2003 in Saitama || Saitama, Japan || KO (Punch) || 1 || 2:55 || 89-18-1
|-  bgcolor="#CCFFCC"
| 2002-12-07 || Win ||align=left| Jérôme Le Banner || K-1 World Grand Prix 2002 Final || Tokyo, Japan || KO (Right mid-kicks) || 3 || 1:26 || 88-18-1
|-
! style=background:white colspan=9 |
|-
|-  bgcolor="#CCFFCC"
| 2002-12-07 || Win ||align=left| Ray Sefo || K-1 World Grand Prix 2002 Semi Finals || Tokyo, Japan || TKO (Shin injury) || 1 || 1:49 || 87-18-1
|-  bgcolor="#FFBBBB"
| 2002-12-07 || Loss ||align=left| Bob Sapp || K-1 World Grand Prix 2002 Quarter Finals || Tokyo, Japan || TKO (Referee stoppage) || 2 || 2:53 || 86-18-1
|-
! style=background:white colspan=9 |
|-
|-  bgcolor="#FFBBBB"
| 2002-10-05 || Loss ||align=left| Bob Sapp || K-1 World Grand Prix 2002 Final Elimination || Saitama, Japan || TKO (Doctor stoppage) || 1 || 3:00 || 86-17-1
|-
! style=background:white colspan=9 |
|-
|-  bgcolor="#c5d2ea"
| 2002-08-28 || Draw ||align=left| Semmy Schilt || Pride Shockwave || Tokyo, Japan || Draw || 5 || 3:00 || 86-16-1
|-  bgcolor="#CCFFCC"
| 2002-08-17 || Win ||align=left| Jan Nortje || K-1 World Grand Prix 2002 in Las Vegas || Las Vegas, Nevada || KO (Kick) || 3 || 1:29 || 86-16
|-  bgcolor="#CCFFCC"
| 2002-05-22 || Win ||align=left| Stefan Leko || K-1 World Grand Prix 2002 in Paris || Paris, France || KO (Punches) || 1 || 1:48 || 85-16
|-  bgcolor="#CCFFCC"
| 2002-04-21 || Win ||align=left| Tsuyoshi Nakasako || K-1 Burning 2002 || Hiroshima, Japan || KO || 1 || 1:46 || 84-16
|-  bgcolor="#CCFFCC"
| 2001-12-08 || Win ||align=left| Stefan Leko || K-1 World Grand Prix 2001 Quarter Finals || Tokyo, Japan || Decision (Unanimous) || 3 || 3:00 || 83-16
|-
! style=background:white colspan=9 |
|-
|-  bgcolor="#CCFFCC"
| 2001-06-16 || Win ||align=left| Matt Skelton || K-1 World Grand Prix 2001 in Melbourne Final || Melbourne, Australia || Decision (Majority) || 3 || 3:00 || 82-16
|-
! style=background:white colspan=9 |
|-
|-  bgcolor="#CCFFCC"
| 2001-06-16 || Win ||align=left| Mark Hunt || K-1 World Grand Prix 2001 in Melbourne Semi Finals || Melbourne, Australia || Decision (Unanimous) || 3 || 3:00 || 81-16
|-  bgcolor="#CCFFCC"
| 2001-06-16 || Win ||align=left| Sergei Gur || K-1 World Grand Prix 2001 in Melbourne Quarter Finals || Melbourne, Australia || TKO (Referee stoppage) || 1 || 2:03 || 80-16
|-
|-  bgcolor="#CCFFCC"
| 2001-04-15 || Win ||align=left| Musashi || K-1 Burning 2001 || Kumamoto, Japan || Decision (Majority) || 5 || 3:00 || 79-16
|-  bgcolor="#CCFFCC"
| 2001-03-18 || Win ||align=left| Xhavit Bajrami || 2H2H - Simply The Best || Amsterdam, Netherlands || Decision || 5 || 3:00 || 78-16
|-  bgcolor="#CCFFCC"
| 2000-12-10 || Win ||align=left| Ray Sefo || K-1 World Grand Prix 2000 Final || Tokyo, Japan || Decision (Unanimous) || 3 || 3:00 || 77-16
|-
! style=background:white colspan=9 |
|-
|-  bgcolor="#CCFFCC"
| 2000-12-10 || Win ||align=left| Francisco Filho || K-1 World Grand Prix 2000 Semi Finals || Tokyo, Japan || Decision (Unanimous) || 3 || 3:00 || 76-16
|-  bgcolor="#CCFFCC"
| 2000-12-10 || Win ||align=left| Mirko Cro Cop || K-1 World Grand Prix 2000 Quarter Finals || Tokyo, Japan || Ext. R Decision (Unanimous) || 4 || 3:00 || 75-16
|-  bgcolor="#FFBBBB"
| 2000-07-30 || Loss ||align=left| Jérôme Le Banner || K-1 World Grand Prix 2000 in Nagoya Final || Nagoya, Japan || TKO (Corner stoppage) || 1 || 3:00 || 74-16
|-
! style=background:white colspan=9 |
|-
|-  bgcolor="#CCFFCC"
| 2000-07-30 || Win ||align=left| Lloyd van Dams || K-1 World Grand Prix 2000 in Nagoya Semi Finals || Nagoya, Japan || Decision (Majority) || 3 || 3:00 || 74-15
|-  bgcolor="#CCFFCC"
| 2000-07-30 || Win ||align=left| Paris Vasilikos || K-1 World Grand Prix 2000 in Nagoya Quarter Finals || Nagoya, Japan || KO (Right punch) || 3 || 2:20 || 73-15
|-  bgcolor="#CCFFCC"
| 2000-05-28 || Win ||align=left| Rani Berbachi || K-1 Survival 2000 || Sapporo, Japan || TKO (Corner stoppage)|| 3 || 3:00 || 72-15
|-  bgcolor="#CCFFCC"
| 2000-04-23 || Win ||align=left| Sam Greco || K-1 The Millennium || Osaka, Japan || TKO (Corner stoppage) || 3 || 3:00 || 71-15
|-  bgcolor="#CCFFCC"
| 1999-12-05 || Win ||align=left| Mirko Cro Cop || K-1 World Grand Prix 1999 Final || Tokyo, Japan || KO (Left body shot)|| 3 || 1:09 || 70-15
|-
! style=background:white colspan=9 |
|-
|-  bgcolor="#CCFFCC"
| 1999-12-05 || Win ||align=left| Jérôme Le Banner || K-1 World Grand Prix 1999 Semi Finals || Tokyo, Japan || KO (Right hook)  || 2 || 0:26 || 69-15
|-  bgcolor="#CCFFCC"
| 1999-12-05 || Win ||align=left| Andy Hug || K-1 World Grand Prix 1999 Quarter Finals || Tokyo, Japan || Decision (Unanimous) || 3 || 3:00 || 68-15
|-  bgcolor="#CCFFCC"
| 1999-10-03 || Win ||align=left| Xhavit Bajrami || K-1 World Grand Prix '99 Opening Round || Osaka, Japan || Decision (Unanimous) || 5 || 3:00 || 67-15
|-
! style=background:white colspan=9 |
|-
|-  bgcolor="#CCFFCC"
| 1999-07-18 || Win ||align=left| Igor Vovchanchyn || K-1 Dream '99 || Nagoya, Japan || TKO (Low kicks/3 knockdowns) || 3 || 0:51 || 66-15
|-  bgcolor="#FFBBBB"
| 1999-04-25 || Loss ||align=left| Francisco Filho || K-1 Revenge '99 || Yokohama, Japan || KO (Right hook) || 1 || 1:37 || 65-15
|-  bgcolor="#FFBBBB"
| 1998-12-13 || Loss ||align=left| Sam Greco || K-1 Grand Prix '98 Final Round Quarter Finals || Tokyo, Japan || TKO (Corner stoppage) || 2 || 3:00 || 65-14
|-  bgcolor="#CCFFCC"
| 1998-09-27 || Win ||align=left| Tasis Petridis || K-1 World Grand Prix '98 Opening Round || Osaka, Japan || TKO (Corner stoppage) || 4 || 3:00 || 65-13
|-
! style=background:white colspan=9 |
|-
|-  bgcolor="#CCFFCC"
| 1998-08-07 || Win ||align=left| Maurice Smith || K-1 USA Grand Prix '98 || Las Vegas, Nevada || Decision (Unanimous) || 5 || 3:00 || 64-13
|-  bgcolor="#CCFFCC"
| 1998-07-18 || Win ||align=left| Musashi || K-1 Dream '98 || Nagoya, Japan || TKO (Referee stoppage) || 3 || 2:52 || 63-13
|-  bgcolor="#CCFFCC"
| 1998-05-24 || Win ||align=left| Jean Riviere || K-1 Braves '98 || Fukuoka, Japan || KO (Right high kick)|| 1 || 1:17 || 62-13
|-  bgcolor="#FFBBBB"
| 1998-04-09 || Loss ||align=left| Peter Aerts || K-1 Kings '98 || Yokohama, Japan || Decision (Majority) || 5 ||3:00 || 61-13
|-  bgcolor="#CCFFCC"
| 1997-11-19 || Win ||align=left| Andy Hug || K-1 World Grand Prix 1997 Final || Tokyo, Japan || Decision (Majority) || 3 || 3:00 || 61-12
|-
! style=background:white colspan=9 |
|-
|-  bgcolor="#CCFFCC"
| 1997-11-19 || Win ||align=left| Francisco Filho || K-1 World Grand Prix 1997 Semi Finals || Tokyo, Japan || Decision (Majority) || 3 || 3:00 || 60-12
|-  bgcolor="#CCFFCC"
| 1997-11-19 || Win ||align=left| Jérôme Le Banner || K-1 World Grand Prix 1997 Quarter Finals || Tokyo, Japan || KO (Right hook) || 1 || 1:15 || 59-12
|-  bgcolor="#CCFFCC"
| 1997-09-07 || Win ||align=left| Stefan Leko || K-1 Grand Prix '97 1st Round || Osaka, Japan || KO (Right cross) || 2 || 0:34 || 58-12
|-
! style=background:white colspan=9 |
|-
|-  bgcolor="#CCFFCC"
| 1997-06-07 || Win ||align=left| Shaun Johnson || K-1 Fight Night '97 || Zurich, Switzerland || KO (Body shot) || 1 || 1:12 || 57-12
|-  bgcolor="#CCFFCC"
| 1997-04-29 || Win ||align=left| Mike Bernardo || K-1 Braves '97 || Fukuoka, Japan || TKO (Referee stoppage/Right hook) || 4 || 1:03 || 56-12
|-  bgcolor="#CCFFCC"
| 1997-03-16 || Win ||align=left| Duane Van Der Merwe || K-1 Kings '97 || Yokohama, Japan || KO (Kick)|| 3 || 1:49 || 55-12
|-  bgcolor="#CCFFCC"
| 1996-12-08 || Win ||align=left| Ray Sefo || K-1 Hercules '96 || Nagoya, Japan || KO (Low kicks)|| 4 || 0:25 || 54-12
|-  bgcolor="#FFBBBB"
| 1996-10-18 || Loss ||align=left| Jérôme Le Banner || K-1 Star Wars '96 || Yokohama, Japan || TKO (Right hook) || 2 || 2:57 || 53-12
|-  bgcolor="#CCFFCC"
| 1996-09-01 || Win ||align=left| Carl Bernardo || K-1 Revenge '96 || Osaka, Japan || KO || 2 || 0:20 || 53-11
|-  bgcolor="#FFBBBB"
| 1996-05-06 || Loss ||align=left| Andy Hug || K-1 World Grand Prix 1996 Semi Finals || Yokohama, Japan || 2nd Ext. R Decision (Split) || 5 || 3:00 || 52-11
|-  bgcolor="#CCFFCC"
| 1996-05-06 || Win ||align=left| Mirko Cro Cop || K-1 World Grand Prix 1996 Quarter Finals || Yokohama, Japan || KO (Right low kick) || 3 || 1:27 || 52-10
|-  bgcolor="#CCFFCC"
| 1996-03-10 || Win ||align=left| Stuart Green || K-1 Grand Prix '96 Opening Battle || Yokohama, Japan || KO (Kick) || 2 || 0:09 || 51-10
|-
! style=background:white colspan=9|
|-
|-  bgcolor="#CCFFCC"
| 1995-12-09 || Win ||align=left| Maurice Travis || K-1 Hercules || Nagoya, Japan || TKO (Corner stoppage) || 1 || 2:13 || 50-10
|-  bgcolor="#CCFFCC"
| 1995-09-03 || Win ||align=left| Michael Thompson || K-1 Revenge II || Yokohama, Japan || TKO || 2 || 2:45 || 49-10
|-  bgcolor="#CCFFCC"
| 1995-07-16 || Win ||align=left| Andy Hug || K-3 Grand Prix '95 || Japan || Decision (Majority) || 3 || 3:00 || 48-10
|-  bgcolor="#FFBBBB"
| 1995-05-04 || Loss ||align=left| Peter Aerts || K-1 Grand Prix '95 Semi Finals || Tokyo, Japan || Ext. R Decision (Unanimous) || 4 || 3:00 || 47-10
|-  bgcolor="#CCFFCC"
| 1995-05-04 || Win ||align=left| John Kleijn || K-1 Grand Prix '95 Quarter Finals || Tokyo, Japan || KO (Right cross) || 2 || 0:45 || 47-9
|-  bgcolor="#CCFFCC"
| 1995-03-03 || Win ||align=left| Hubert Numrich||K-1 Grand Prix '95 Opening Battle || Tokyo, Japan || KO (Right cross) || 4 || 2:25 || 46-9
|-
! style=background:white colspan=9|
|-
|-  bgcolor="#FFBBBB"
| 1994-12-10 || Loss ||align=left| Branko Cikatić || K-1 Legend || Nagoya, Japan || KO (Right hook) || 2 || 1:18 || 45-9
|-  bgcolor="#CCFFCC"
| 1994-11-12 || Win ||align=left| Rick Roufus || Thriller in Marseille || Marseille, France || KO (Right high kick) || 11 || 1:02 || 45-8
|-
! style=background:white colspan=9 |
|-
|-  bgcolor="#CCFFCC"
| 1994-09-18 || Win ||align=left| Mark Russell || K-1 Revenge || Yokohama, Japan || TKO (3 knockdowns) || 2 || 2:42 || 44-8
|-  bgcolor="#CCFFCC"
| 1994-06-25 || Win ||align=left| Davidov || N/A || France || N/A || N/A || N/A || 43-8
|-  bgcolor="#CCFFCC"
| 1994-05-08 || Win ||align=left| Bob Schreiber || K-2 Plus Tournament 1994 Final || Amsterdam, Netherlands || KO || 1 || 3:00 || 42-8
|-
! style=background:white colspan=9 |
|-
|-  bgcolor="#CCFFCC"
| 1994-05-08 || Win ||align=left| Mark Russell || K-2 Plus Tournament 1994 Semi Finals || Amsterdam, Netherlands || TKO (3 knockdowns) || 2 || 2:05 || 41-8
|-  bgcolor="#CCFFCC"
| 1994-05-08 || Win ||align=left| Tony Luciano || K-2 Plus Tournament 1994 Quarter Finals || Amsterdam, Netherlands || Decision || 3 || 3:00 || 40-8
|-  bgcolor="#CCFFCC"
| 1994-03-04 || Win ||align=left| Masaaki Satake || K-1 Challenge || Tokyo, Japan || KO (Left high kick) || 2 || 2:45 || 39-8
|-  bgcolor="#CCFFCC"
| 1993-12-19 || Win ||align=left| Changpuek Kiatsongrit || K-2 Grand Prix '93 Final || Tokyo, Japan || KO (Right high kick) || 4 || 0:40 || 38-8
|-
! style=background:white colspan=9 |
|-
|-  bgcolor="#CCFFCC"
| 1993-12-19 || Win ||align=left| Adam Watt || K-2 Grand Prix '93 Semi Finals || Tokyo, Japan || TKO (2 knockdowns) || 1 || 2:13 || 37-8
|-  bgcolor="#CCFFCC"
| 1993-12-19 || Win ||align=left| Manson Gibson || K-2 Grand Prix '93 Quarter Finals || Tokyo, Japan || Ext. R Decision (Majority) || 4 || 3:00 || 36-8
|-  bgcolor="#CCFFCC"
| 1993-09-04 || Win ||align=left| Tasis Petridis || K-1 Illusion || Tokyo, Japan || TKO (3 knockdowns) || 3 || 0:45 || 35-8
|-
! style=background:white colspan=9 |
|-
|-  bgcolor="#FFBBBB"
| 1993-04-30 || Loss ||align=left| Branko Cikatić || K-1 Grand Prix '93 Final || Tokyo, Japan || KO (Right hook) || 1 || 2:49 || 34-8
|-
! style=background:white colspan=9 |
|-
|-  bgcolor="#CCFFCC"
| 1993-04-30 || Win ||align=left| Maurice Smith || K-1 Grand Prix '93 Semi Finals || Tokyo, Japan || KO (Left high kick) || 3 || 1:18 || 34-7
|-
|-  bgcolor="#CCFFCC"
| 1993-04-30 || Win ||align=left| Peter Aerts || K-1 Grand Prix '93 Quarter Finals || Tokyo, Japan || Decision (Majority) || 3 || 3:00 || 33-7
|-
|-  bgcolor="#CCFFCC"
| 1993-02-14 || Win ||align=left| Troy Hughes || N/A || N/A || N/A || N/A || N/A || 32-7
|-  bgcolor="#CCFFCC"
| 1992 || Win ||align=left| Sanmark || N/A || N/A || KO || N/A || N/A || 31-7
|-  bgcolor="#FFBBBB"
| 1992-11-13 || Loss ||align=left| Rick Roufus || N/A || New York, NY || Decision (Unanimous) || 12 || 2:00 || 30-7
|-
! style=background:white colspan=9 |
|-
|-  bgcolor="#CCFFCC"
| 1992-10-25 || Win ||align=left| Theppitak Sangmoragot || Holland vs Thailand: The Revenge || Amsterdam, Netherlands || KO (Left punch) || 2 || 2:14 || 30-6
|-
! style=background:white colspan=9 |
|-
|-  bgcolor="#CCFFCC"
| 1992-04-26 || Win ||align=left| Joe Caktas || N/A || N/A || N/A || N/A || N/A || 29-6
|-  bgcolor="#CCFFCC"
| 1991-10-20 || Win ||align=left| Leo de Snoo || Hot Night in Amsterdam || Amsterdam, Netherlands || Decision || 5 || 3:00 || 28-6
|-  bgcolor="#CCFFCC"
| 1991-04-21 || Win ||align=left| Jan Wessels || Kickboxing "Holland vs Canada" || Amsterdam, Netherlands || Decision (Unanimous) || 5 || 3:00 || 27-6
|-  bgcolor="#CCFFCC"
| 1991-02-17 || Win ||align=left| Luc Verheye || Holland vs Thailand VI || Netherlands || Decision (Unanimous) || 5 || 3:00 || 26-6
|-  bgcolor="#FFBBBB"
| 1990-11-18 || Loss ||align=left| Rob Kaman || The Battle of the Year || Amsterdam, Netherlands || KO (Left hook) || 5 || N/A || 25-6
|-  bgcolor="#CCFFCC"
| 1990-10-14 || Win ||align=left| Seyoke || Holland vs Thailand V || Amsterdam, Netherlands || KO || 1 || N/A || 25-5
|-
! style=background:white colspan=9 |
|-
|-  bgcolor="#CCFFCC"
| 1990-01-28 || Win ||align=left| Ernest Simmons || N/A || Amsterdam, Netherlands || KO || 3 || N/A || 24-5
|-
! style=background:white colspan=9 |
|-
|-  bgcolor="#CCFFCC"
| 1989-10-08 || Win ||align=left| Branko Cikatić || N/A || Amsterdam, Netherlands || DQ || 4 || N/A || 23-5
|-
! style=background:white colspan=9 |
|-
|-  bgcolor="#CCFFCC"
| 1989-08-27 || Win ||align=left| Francis Dauvin || N/A || Paris, France || KO || 2 || N/A || 22-5
|-
! style=background:white colspan=9 |
|-
|-  bgcolor="#CCFFCC"
| 1989-05-19 || Win ||align=left| Pascal Ducros || N/A || N/A || N/A || N/A || N/A || 21-5
|-  bgcolor="#FFBBBB"
| 1989-04-21 || Loss ||align=left| Jean-Yves Thériault || N/A || Geneva, Switzerland || Decision (Split) || 12 || 2:00 || 20-5
|-  bgcolor="#CCFFCC"
| 1989-02-19 || Win ||align=left| Kirkwood Walker || N/A || Amsterdam, Netherlands || Decision || 5 || 3:00 || 20-4
|-  bgcolor="#CCFFCC"
| 1988-11-20 || Win ||align=left| Peter Aerts || N/A || Netherlands || Decision || 5 || 3:00 || 19-4
|-  bgcolor="#CCFFCC"
| 1988-09-25 || Win ||align=left| Benoit Brilliant || N/A || Strasbourg, France || KO || 6 || N/A || 18-4
|-
! style=background:white colspan=9 |
|-
|-  bgcolor="#CCFFCC"
| 1988-06-11 || Win ||align=left| Sylvain Postel || Champions in Action || Amsterdam, Netherlands || KO || 5 || N/A || 17-4
|-  bgcolor="#CCFFCC"
| 1988-06-03 || Win ||align=left| Regis Lessaint || N/A || Le Havre, France || KO || 3 || N/A || 16-4
|-
! style=background:white colspan=9 |
|-
|-  bgcolor="#CCFFCC"
| 1988-05-07 || Win ||align=left| Francois Corremans || Superfights II || Arnhem, Netherlands || Decision || 5 || 3:00 || 15-4
|-
! style=background:white colspan=9 |
|-
|-  bgcolor="#CCFFCC"
| 1988-02-27 || Win ||align=left| Andre Mannaart || Superfights I || Amsterdam, Netherlands || KO || 3 || N/A || 14-4
|-  bgcolor="#CCFFCC"
| 1987-12-05 || Win ||align=left| Latricin || N/A || N/A || N/A || N/A || N/A || 13-4
|-  bgcolor="#CCFFCC"
| 1987-11-08 || Win ||align=left| Kenneth Plak || N/A || Amsterdam, Netherlands || Decision || 5 || 3:00 || 12-4
|-
! style=background:white colspan=9 |
|-
|-  bgcolor="#FFBBBB"
| 1987-09-10 || Loss ||align=left|  Ronnie Wagenmaker || N/A || N/A || KO || N/A || N/A || 11-4
|-  bgcolor="#CCFFCC"
| 1987-05-31 || Win ||align=left| Pascal Ducros || Kick-Thaiboxing Gala in Amsterdam || Amsterdam, Netherlands || Decision || 5 || 3:00 || 11-3
|-  bgcolor="#FFBBBB"
| 1987-02-01 || Loss ||align=left| Rob Kaman || W.K.A. Kickboxing || Amsterdam, Netherlands || Decision (Unanimous) || 5 || 3:00 || 10-3
|-  bgcolor="#FFBBBB"
| 1986-12-14 || Loss ||align=left| Jean-Yves Thériault || N/A || Montreal, Canada || Decision (Unanimous) || 12 || 2:00 || 10-2
|-  bgcolor="#FFBBBB"
| 1986-06-12 || Loss ||align=left| Ernest Simmons || N/A ||  Florida, United States || N/A || N/A || N/A || 10-1
|-  bgcolor="#CCFFCC"
| 1986-03-02 || Win ||align=left| Leo de Snoo || N/A || Netherlands || N/A || N/A || N/A || 10-0
|-  bgcolor="#CCFFCC"
| 1986-01-18 || Win ||align=left| Roy Martina || N/A || N/A || KO || N/A || N/A || 9-0
|-  bgcolor="#CCFFCC"
| 1985-10-20 || Win ||align=left| Andre Mannaart || N/A || Amsterdam, Netherlands || Decision || 5 || 3:00 || 8-0
|-  bgcolor="#CCFFCC"
| 1985-06-23 || Win ||align=left| Rob Floris || N/A || N/A || KO || N/A || N/A || 7-0
|-  bgcolor="#CCFFCC"
| 1985-05-31 || Win ||align=left| Gerardy || N/A || N/A || KO || N/A || N/A || 6-0
|-  bgcolor="#CCFFCC"
| 1985-03-10 || Win ||align=left| Leo de Snoo || N/A || Netherlands || N/A || N/A || N/A || 5-0
|-  bgcolor="#CCFFCC"
| 1984-11-18 || Win ||align=left| Drielle || N/A || N/A || KO || N/A || N/A || 4-0
|-  bgcolor="#CCFFCC"
| 1984-10-20 || Win ||align=left| Ricardo Darsan || N/A || N/A || KO || N/A || N/A || 3-0
|-  bgcolor="#CCFFCC"
| 1984-03-25 || Win ||align=left| Rijntjes || N/A || Netherlands || KO || N/A || N/A || 2-0
|-  bgcolor="#CCFFCC"
| 1983-12-11 || Win ||align=left| Wim Scharrenberg || N/A || Netherlands || KO || 2 || N/A || 1-0
|-
| colspan=9 | Legend:

See also
List of K-1 events
List of K-1 champions
List of male kickboxers

References

External links
Official website of Ernesto Hoost
Ernesto Hoost (Audio) interview
Ernesto Hoost interview from 1995

1965 births
Living people
Dutch male kickboxers
Light heavyweight kickboxers
Cruiserweight kickboxers
Heavyweight kickboxers
Dutch Muay Thai practitioners
Dutch savateurs
Kickboxing commentators
Kickboxing trainers
People from Heemskerk
Dutch sportspeople of Surinamese descent
Sportspeople from North Holland
HVV Hollandia players
Association footballers not categorized by position